Greg Cook (1946–2012) was an American football quarterback.

Greg Cook may also refer to:
Greg Cook (basketball) (1958–2005), American basketball player
Greg Cook (cartoonist) (21st century), American comic book artist
Greg Cook (judge), American judge, Associate Justice of the Supreme Court of Alabama
Greg Cook (rugby league) (born 1956), Australian rugby league player
Greg Cook (born 1965), American country music bassist with Ricochet